Major General Haile Samuel is current Commander of Operation Zone 4 for Eritrea.

Eritrea has Five Operation Zones, each headed by a high-ranking military official. These zones overlap the six administrative regions. The power of the Operation Zone commanders supersedes that of the administrators who head the 6 regions.

References

Year of birth missing (living people)
Living people
Eritrean soldiers